An alcohol sachet is a small sealed soft plastic pouch containing an alcoholic beverage. They are popular in Africa as a format for inexpensive liquor, and have been banned in several African nations due to concerns of public health and civil order.

Prohibitions
Alcohol sachets were banned:
2004 in Kenya
2015 in Malawi
2016 in Cameroon
2017 in Tanzania

References

Alcoholic drinks
Alcohol in Africa